Super Bowl LVII was an American football game played to determine the champion of the National Football League (NFL) for the 2022 season. The American Football Conference (AFC) champion Kansas City Chiefs defeated the National Football Conference (NFC) champion Philadelphia Eagles, 38–35. The game was played on February 12, 2023, at State Farm Stadium in Glendale, Arizona. It was the fourth Super Bowl hosted by the Phoenix metropolitan area, and the third at this venue, with the most recent previously being Super Bowl XLIX in 2015.

Both teams finished the regular season with a league-best 14–3 record. This was the Chiefs' fifth Super Bowl appearance overall and third in the last four seasons. This marked the Chiefs' third Super Bowl win, having previously won Super Bowls IV and LIV; the Chiefs previously lost Super Bowls I and LV. This was the Eagles' fourth Super Bowl appearance after a win in Super Bowl LII and losses in Super Bowls XV and XXXIX.

After the Eagles went into halftime up 24–14, the Chiefs mounted a comeback to win the game 38–35 with a game-winning field goal kicked by Harrison Butker. The 73 combined points was the third-highest scoring Super Bowl game, and the 35 scored by the Eagles were the most by the losing team in the Super Bowl. Chiefs quarterback Patrick Mahomes was named Super Bowl Most Valuable Player (MVP), completing 21 of 27 passes for 182 yards and three touchdowns, while also rushing six times for 44 yards. Mahomes became the first player since Kurt Warner in 1999 to win an NFL MVP and a Super Bowl MVP (let alone a Super Bowl) in the same season.

Fox's broadcast of the game became the second-most-watched program in American television history and the third-most watched American television broadcast with an average of 113 million viewers. The halftime show, headlined by Rihanna, peaked at 118.7 million viewers.

Background

Host selection 
Beginning with Super Bowl LVI, a new system was introduced to select Super Bowl hosting sites. Discarding the previous process that allowed cities to submit bids for the hosting rights, the league unilaterally chooses a single hosting site for each game. The chosen city then creates a proposal that is voted upon at the league's owners' meetings. Arizona was the first location chosen under this process; its proposal was accepted unanimously on May 23, 2018.

The official logo was unveiled on February 14, 2022; it follows the updated logo template introduced by Super Bowl LVI, with imagery of a sunset resembling Arizona's state flag behind a desert canyon to reflect the landscapes of the host region.

Calls for location change 
In February 2022, over 200 liberal religious leaders, including Rev. Jesse Jackson and Rev. Dr. William Barber II, petitioned NFL Commissioner Roger Goodell to move Super Bowl LVII out of Arizona after they accused the Arizona legislature of enacting unnecessary voting restrictions with HB 1003, SB 1485, and SB 1819. Arizona Democratic Party vice-chair Brianna Westbrook also voiced her support to move the Super Bowl after the Arizona legislature passed SB 1138 and SB 1165, which restricts access to gender-affirming care for minors, and bans transgender girls from playing on girls' sports teams.

Indigenous representation 

The game and surrounding festivities included acknowledgements of the Indigenous peoples of Arizona; the Ak-Chin Indian Community, Fort McDowell Yavapai Nation, Gila River Indian Community, and Tohono O'odham Nation were named as Host Committee Partners, and the official branding for the game features artwork by Lucinda "La Morena" Hinojos, featuring the White Tank Mountains adorned with 22 diamonds representing the Native American tribes that have a presence in Arizona. This marked the first time an Indigenous artist was commissioned to create the official artwork for the Super Bowl. An  mural in downtown Phoenix was also commissioned in collaboration between Hinojos and other Indigenous artists.

For the first time, a land acknowledgment was read during a ceremony on February 6 attended by representatives of the Host Committee Partner tribes, while dance troupe Indigenous Enterprise performed during Super Bowl Opening Night, and as part of entertainment outside State Farm Stadium on the day of the game.

The presence of the Kansas City Chiefs led to continued calls against the use of Native American imagery by the team and its fans (including the "tomahawk chop"), including by the Kansas City Indian Center, the National Congress of American Indians, and the first Indigenous Secretary of the Interior Deb Haaland. Groups of Indigenous activists organized a protest rally outside State Farm Stadium.

Stadium playing surface 
The NFL spent two years preparing the grass used in Super Bowl LVII. The field, made of Tahoma 31 grass, was grown at a local sod farm in Phoenix. Despite the field prep, multiple players could be seen slipping and falling on the surface. Players from both teams criticized the playing surface, and several players changed cleats during the game to get better traction. During their Week 1 matchup against the Arizona Cardinals, Chiefs players had complained of the playing surface at the time (it was replaced by February) which potentially led to injuries to Harrison Butker and Trent McDuffie.

Teams

Kansas City Chiefs

Kansas City finished the season with their tenth consecutive winning record under head coach Andy Reid, going 14–3 and advancing to their third Super Bowl in the last four years with one-score wins over the Jacksonville Jaguars (Divisional Round) and Cincinnati Bengals (AFC Championship Game).

The Chiefs traded star wide receiver Tyreek Hill to the Miami Dolphins in the offseason for draft picks but still finished the year as the NFL's best offense, leading the league in yards (7,032) and points scored (496). Quarterback Patrick Mahomes made his fifth consecutive Pro Bowl and won his second NFL Most Valuable Player award, leading the league with a career-high 5,250 passing yards and 41 touchdowns while throwing 12 interceptions. His passer rating of 105.2 was the second-highest in the league. He also rushed for 354 yards and four touchdowns, setting the NFL record for most combined passing and rushing yards in a season with 5,608. Pro Bowl tight end Travis Kelce was the team's leading receiver with 1,338 receiving yards and 12 touchdowns. The team also added in a pair of veteran receivers to help make up for the loss of Hill: JuJu Smith-Schuster (933 yards and three touchdowns) and Marquez Valdes-Scantling (687 yards and two touchdowns). The Chiefs' running game was led by rookie Isiah Pacheco, who had stepped into the leading role due to a midseason injury to starter Clyde Edwards-Helaire. Pacheco finished the season with 830 rushing yards and five touchdowns while also gaining 130 receiving yards and returning kickoffs with an average of 20.6 yards per return. Veteran running back Jerick McKinnon added 803 yards from scrimmage and 10 touchdowns. Their offensive line featured three Pro Bowl selections: guard Joe Thuney, tackle Orlando Brown Jr., and center Creed Humphrey. Punter Tommy Townsend also made the Pro Bowl, ranking second in the NFL in yards per punt (50.4) and leading the league with a 45.4 net average.

Kansas City's defensive line featured Pro Bowl defensive tackle Chris Jones, who led the team with 15.5 sacks, along with defensive ends George Karlaftis (6 sacks, seven pass deflections) and Frank Clark (5 sacks). Linebacker Nick Bolton led the team with 180 combined tackles and two interceptions. The secondary was led by cornerback L'Jarius Sneed (three interceptions, 108 tackles, three forced fumbles, 3.5 sacks) and safety Juan Thornhill (three interceptions, 71 tackles).

This was Kansas City's fifth Super Bowl, following wins in Super Bowls IV and LIV and losses in Super Bowls I and LV. The Chiefs also won the American Football League championship in 1962.

Philadelphia Eagles
 

Under second-year head coach Nick Sirianni, the Eagles started the season winning eight consecutive games before finishing the season tied for an NFL-best 14–3 record and advancing to the Super Bowl by easily defeating their two playoff opponents (the New York Giants in the Divisional Round, and the San Francisco 49ers in the NFC Championship Game) by a combined score of 69–14. The team excelled on both sides of the ball, scoring 477 points (third most in the NFL) while only allowing 344 (eighth fewest) and sending an NFL-best eight players to the Pro Bowl.

Pro Bowl quarterback Jalen Hurts led the offense, setting career highs in his third season in completion percentage (66.5%), passing yards (3,701), and passing touchdowns (22) while throwing just six interceptions, giving a career-high 101.5 passer rating, the fourth-best in the NFL. Hurts also rushed for 736 yards and 13 touchdowns, the second-highest total in the league among quarterbacks. Pro Bowl receiver A. J. Brown, acquired from the Tennessee Titans in the off-season, posted 1,496 receiving yards and eleven touchdowns, while second-year receiver DeVonta Smith added 1,196 yards and seven scores. Tight end Dallas Goedert was another reliable target with 702 yards and three touchdowns. Pro Bowl running back Miles Sanders ranked fifth in the NFL with 1,269 yards and eleven touchdowns, averaging 4.9 yards per carry. The team also sent three offensive linemen to the Pro Bowl: guard Landon Dickerson, tackle Lane Johnson, and center Jason Kelce. Kicker Jake Elliott made 20 of 23 field goals (87%), including 5-of-6 from at least 50 yards.

Philadelphia's defense ranked second in the league in yards allowed (5,125) and set an NFL record with four players who recorded at least ten sacks. The defensive line features defensive ends Josh Sweat and Brandon Graham, who each recorded 11 sacks, along with defensive tackles Fletcher Cox (seven sacks), Javon Hargrave (11 sacks), and Milton Williams (4 sacks). Pro Bowl linebacker Haason Reddick ranked second in the NFL with 16 sacks while forcing five fumbles and recovering three. Linebackers T. J. Edwards and Kyzir White each recorded over 100 combined tackles and broke up seven passes. In the secondary, safety C. J. Gardner-Johnson co-led the NFL with six interceptions, while All-Pro cornerbacks Darius Slay and James Bradberry each had three.

It was Philadelphia's fourth Super Bowl, following a win in Super Bowl LII and losses in Super Bowls XV and XXXIX. The Eagles also won three pre-Super Bowl NFL championships in 1948, 1949, and 1960.

Playoffs

The Chiefs entered the playoffs as the  1 seed in the AFC. They defeated the Jacksonville Jaguars, 27–20, in the AFC Divisional round. In a tightly contested game, the Chiefs held off a late fourth-quarter rally by the Jaguars. Chiefs quarterback Patrick Mahomes went down early in the game with a high right ankle sprain injury which forced him out of the game for a drive, but he was able to return shortly after leaving. The AFC Championship pitted the Chiefs against the Cincinnati Bengals in a rematch of the 2021 AFC Championship game. This was the fifth consecutive AFC Championship hosted by the Chiefs, extending their record. Much like the previous year's contest, the game was close toward the end of the fourth quarter. On the game's last drive, tied at 20, Bengals defensive end Joseph Ossai was flagged for a late hit on Patrick Mahomes after he stepped out of bounds, which set the Chiefs up in field goal range with eight seconds remaining. Harrison Butker then kicked a 45-yard field goal to send the Chiefs to the Super Bowl with a 23–20 win.

The Eagles went into the playoffs as the  1 seed in the NFC. Their first playoff matchup was against their NFC East rival New York Giants. The Eagles quickly jumped to a 28–0 halftime lead and cruised to the NFC Championship game with a 38–7 victory, which marked the first playoff win for Eagles quarterback Jalen Hurts and head coach Nick Sirianni. In the NFC Championship, the Eagles hosted the San Francisco 49ers. The Eagles won the NFC Championship, 31–7, as the 49ers lost their starting and backup quarterbacks to injury.

Pre-game notes

As the designated home team in the Super Bowl's annual rotation between the two conferences, the Eagles chose to wear their green home jerseys with white pants. The Chiefs wore their white away jerseys with red pants.

As the designated home team, the Eagles practiced at the host team Arizona Cardinals' practice facility in Tempe, Arizona, the week leading up to the game. The Chiefs also practiced at Arizona State University in Tempe.

Reid became the fifth head coach to face his former team in the Super Bowl, joining Weeb Ewbank (Super Bowl III), Dan Reeves (XXXIII), Jon Gruden (XXXVII), and Pete Carroll (XLIX).

The game was also referred to as the "Kelce Bowl", as this marked the first Super Bowl to feature brothers playing against each other: Chiefs tight end Travis Kelce and Eagles center Jason Kelce.

The game was the first Super Bowl between two black starting quarterbacks: Patrick Mahomes of the Chiefs and Jalen Hurts of the Eagles. Mahomes (27 years of age) and Hurts (24) were the youngest starting quarterback pair in Super Bowl history.

Broadcasting

United States
Super Bowl LVII was televised by Fox and Fox Deportes. It marked the final game to be broadcast under the current NFL television contract. Fox aired the season two premiere of Next Level Chef as its lead-out program. The game was available via streaming to mobile devices on NFL+.

Fox broadcast the game in Dolby Vision high-dynamic-range (HDR) color exclusively on Xfinity.

This was the first Super Bowl assignment for Fox's broadcast team of play-by-play announcer Kevin Burkhardt and color analyst Greg Olsen, who replaced Joe Buck and Troy Aikman after they departed for ABC/ESPN and Monday Night Football. Erin Andrews and Tom Rinaldi reported from the sidelines, and Mike Pereira served as rules expert. Pregame, halftime, and postgame coverage were provided by the Fox NFL Sunday team, hosted by Curt Menefee and Terry Bradshaw along with analysts Howie Long, Michael Strahan, Jimmy Johnson, Rob Gronkowski and NFL insider Jay Glazer.

Westwood One provided nationwide radio coverage of the game, which was simulcast by NFL Network as part of their Super Bowl GameCenter coverage, with play-by-play announcer Kevin Harlan, color analyst Kurt Warner, sideline reporters Laura Okmin and Mike Golic, and rules expert Gene Steratore. Scott Graham hosted the pregame, halftime, and postgame shows with Ryan Harris providing analysis.

Advertising
Fox charged up to about $7 million for a 30-second Super Bowl commercial. At least four cryptocurrency-related ads were planned, but their deals fell through after the bankruptcy of FTX in November 2022. One NFT ad aired during the game, which was a giveaway promoting the game Limit Break. Anheuser-Busch purchased three total minutes for its Michelob Ultra, Bud Light, and Busch Light brands. Other advertisers included Heineken, Diageo, Rémy Martin, Molson Coors, Doritos, Google Pixel and M&M's.

Peacock aired a commercial for their series Poker Face created exclusively for the game, which referenced some of those commercials, all of which aired before it. Warner Bros., Universal Pictures, Disney, Paramount Pictures, Sony Pictures, MGM and Amazon Studios also promoted their upcoming films and series during the game, with trailer premieres for The Flash, Fast X, The Super Mario Bros. Movie, Strays, Ant-Man and the Wasp: Quantumania, Guardians of the Galaxy Vol. 3, Indiana Jones and the Dial of Destiny, Scream VI, Dungeons & Dragons: Honor Among Thieves, Transformers: Rise of the Beasts, 65, Creed III and Air. A 15-second spot for Universal's Cocaine Bear aired during the pre-game show. Fox also aired a commercial for the season 9 premiere of The Masked Singer during the game. Disney also aired a commercial to kick off its "100 Years of Wonder" celebration in honor of the centennial anniversary of the founding of The Walt Disney Company. This commercial was called by many as the best of the night, with System1, a specialist in advertising effectiveness, naming it the "most effective" with a rating of 5.3 stars on their Test Your Ad platform.

International
 In Australia, the game was televised by the Seven Network, its sister channel 7mate, and the 7plus on-demand platform. It was also broadcast by ESPN Australia and in New Zealand on the same channel, with ESPN's secondary Monday Night Football team of Steve Levy, Dan Orlovsky and Louis Riddick commentating its international feed.
 In Brazil, the game was televised by ESPN, RedeTV! and the Star+ streaming service.
 In Canada, the game's broadcast rights are owned by Bell Media. The game was televised in English on TSN and CTV, subject to simultaneous substitution; RDS carried the French broadcast of the game. Additionally, the game was streamed over TSN+ and DAZN.
In China, the game was broadcast by Tencent, NFL's media partner for the Chinese market, and nine other TV stations or streaming services also carried the game and Super Bowl coverage provided by Tencent. Tencent and NFL China also sent a crew of 4 reporters to the game.
In France, the game was televised on beIN Sports and on La Chaîne L'Équipe.
 In Germany and Austria, this was the final NFL game televised by ProSieben, Puls 4 and Puls 24 (with original English game commentary) – TV channels that all belong to the same media group: ProSiebenSat.1 Media; television rights for NFL broadcasts will transfer to RTL Group (RTL, Nitro) for the 2023 season, which are also broadcast in Austria.
 In Ireland, the game was televised on Virgin Media Two and Virgin Media Four simulcasting ITV's coverage in the UK.
 In Italy, the game was televised by Rai 2 from RAI – Radio Televisione Italiana and the DAZN streaming service.
 In Latin America, the game was televised by ESPN and the Star+ streaming service.
 In Mexico, the game was televised by Canal 5 from TelevisaUnivision, Azteca 7 from TV Azteca and Fox Sports.
 In the Netherlands, the game was televised by ESPN with options to watch the game with either Dutch or original commentary.
 In Oceania, the game was televised by ESPN.
 In Serbia, the game was televised on Sport Klub. 
 In Spain, Movistar Plus owns the broadcasting rights to the NFL, and the game was broadcast on their paid channel.
 In Sweden, the Super Bowl was televised for the first time by the linear TV channel TV12 and on the streaming service C More, following the broadcasting rights transfer from previous rights-holder NENT/Viaplay which had broadcast the NFL in Sweden since the 1980s.
 In the United Kingdom, the game was televised free-to-air on ITV1 and STV (for the first time since Super Bowl XLI in 2007). It was carried on radio via TalkSPORT and BBC Radio 5 Live.
 In the United Kingdom and Ireland, the game aired on Sky's subscription sports channels Sky Sports NFL and Sky Sports Main Event and subscription entertainment channel Sky Showcase.

Entertainment

Pregame 
American country singer Chris Stapleton sang the national anthem, actress Sheryl Lee Ralph performed "Lift Every Voice and Sing", and R&B singer Kenneth "Babyface" Edmonds sang "America the Beautiful". All three songs were also interpreted in American Sign Language by actor and Arizona native Troy Kotsur, with "America the Beautiful" additionally interpreted in Plains Sign Talk by Collin Denny.

For the first time in Super Bowl history, the flyover was entirely crewed by females to celebrate the 50th anniversary of women flying in the US Navy. Four Navy aircraft taking off from Luke Air Force Base were used: a pair of F/A-18F Super Hornets from the Strike Fighter Squadron 122 "Flying Eagles", an F-35C Lightning II from the Strike Fighter Squadron 97 "Warhawks", and an EA-18G Growler from the Electronic Attack Squadron 129 "Vikings".

Four Pat Tillman Foundation scholars then served as honorary captains during the coin toss ceremony, honoring the memory of Pat Tillman, the former Arizona Cardinals player turned US Army Ranger who was killed in 2004 while stationed in Afghanistan.

Halftime 

On September 23, 2022, Apple Music was announced as the new naming rights sponsor of the Super Bowl halftime show, replacing Pepsi, which had sponsored the previous ten halftime shows.

Barbadian singer Rihanna was announced as the headliner of the halftime show on September 25. It marked Rihanna's first live performance in over five years. In a red outfit, she sang portions of twelve of her songs including "Where Have You Been", "Only Girl (In the World)", and "Work". She announced her pregnancy during the performance.

Game summary

First half

After Kansas City won the coin toss and deferred their choice to the second half, Philadelphia began the game with the ball. Their first drive spanned 75 yards in 11 plays and featured two rushes by Jalen Hurts for 12 yards, and four completed passes—the longest of which was a 23-yard completion to DeVonta Smith. After the Eagles converted a third down from inside the Kansas City 5-yard-line, Hurts scored the game's first points with a 1-yard touchdown run to take a 7–0 lead. Kansas City responded with an 8-play, 75-yard drive that featured a 24-yard run by Isiah Pacheco. Patrick Mahomes also completed two passes to Travis Kelce, including an 18-yard touchdown pass to tie the score. Philadelphia's second drive produced the game's first three-and-out after a pass interference penalty set them back early. Kansas City did not take advantage, as several incompletions set up a 42-yard field goal attempt by Harrison Butker, which hit the left upright and was no-good. The Eagles began their next drive from their 32-yard-line and gained yardage on two Hurts rushes and two Hurts passes, in addition to a defensive offside penalty, before the first quarter ended.

On the first play of the second quarter, Philadelphia retook the lead 14–7 with a 45-yard touchdown pass from Hurts to A. J. Brown. The Chiefs did not recover from a loss of yardage on the first play of their next drive, and they punted as a result of their first three-and-out. After a Hurts pass and a Kenneth Gainwell rush each gained nine yards, Hurts fumbled the ball while running into linebacker Nick Bolton, who recovered it bouncing off the ground in stride and ran 36 yards for a touchdown, tying the game. Hurts led the Eagles on another touchdown drive to take the lead. The Eagles converted a pair of fourth downs, one of them a 4th and 5 with a 28-yard scramble by Hurts, and later by drawing the Chiefs offside on 4th down for the other. Hurts finished the 71-yard drive with a 4-yard touchdown run that made the score 21–14. The Chiefs started their next drive well after gaining a first down in two plays leading into the two-minute warning, ⁣⁣ but they stalled from there and punted with 1:33 remaining in the half. During this drive, Mahomes reaggravated a high ankle sprain that he had suffered early in the season, though the Chiefs did not play any offensive snaps without him. Britain Covey returned the punt 27 yards to his own 43-yard-line, which, in addition to a 22-yard pass from Hurts to Brown near the end of the Eagles' next drive, helped put them into field goal range. Jake Elliott converted a 35-yard kick to increase Philadelphia's lead to ten points going into halftime.

Second half

Kansas City received the ball to begin the second half and drove 75 yards in 12 plays, with Mahomes completing all three of his passes for 26 yards and rushing for 14 before Pacheco's 1-yard touchdown run cut their deficit to three points. Philadelphia responded with a 19-play, 65-yard drive, in which Hurts completed two 17-yard passes to tight end Dallas Goedert, one of which converted a third-and-14. The Kansas City defense stopped the drive at their own 15-yard-line, forcing the Eagles to settle for a 33-yard field goal attempt, which Elliott converted with 1:48 left in the third quarter, making the score 27-21. The Chiefs gained 31 yards on their next four plays, including two Pacheco rushes that reached the Philadelphia 44-yard-line, to end the third quarter.

Mahomes completed four passes to JuJu Smith-Schuster for a total of 38 yards after the quarter break and concluded the Chiefs' 12-play, 75-yard drive with a 5-yard touchdown pass to Kadarius Toney, giving the Chiefs their first lead of the game, 28–27. The Chiefs continued their good form by forcing a Philadelphia three-and-out. Toney returned the Arryn Siposs punt for 65 yards to the Eagles' 5-yard-line and setting a record with the longest punt return in a Super Bowl. Kansas City scored quickly on a 4-yard pass from Mahomes to Skyy Moore. Butker's extra point increased their lead to eight points. Philadelphia took four minutes off the clock on their ensuing drive, which spanned eight plays and resulted in a 45-yard pass to Smith that set up Hurts' 2-yard touchdown run on the next play. Hurts then scored a two-point conversion with a run that tied the score at 35 with 5:15 remaining. At the start of Kansas City's next drive, three runs by Pacheco for 15 yards and two completions by Mahomes for 17 yards moved the ball to the Eagles' 47-yard line. On the next play, Mahomes took off for a 26-yard run that gave the Chiefs a first down on Philadelphia's 17-yard line. A 2-yard run by Pacheco ran the clock down to the two-minute warning. Then an incomplete pass brought up third-and-8. Mahomes threw an incomplete pass on the next play, but Kansas City earned a first down after James Bradberry was penalized for holding—a call that was criticized by some, but was supported by others including by Bradberry himself. On the next play, with first down at the Eagles' 11-yard line, McKinnon rushed to the 2-yard-line where he intentionally downed himself, thereby extending the Chiefs' drive taking more time off the clock. The Chiefs ended the drive by taking a knee twice and kicking a 27-yard field goal, leaving eight seconds on the clock. A Hail Mary pass by Hurts fell incomplete, ending the game.

Mahomes completed 21 of his 27 pass attempts for 182 yards and three touchdowns and was named the Super Bowl MVP. He also ran for 44 yards. Pacheco was the top rusher of the game with 15 carries for 76 yards and a touchdown. Bolton had eight solo tackles, one assist, and a fumble return touchdown. Hurts finished the day 27/38 for 304 yards and a touchdown while rushing 15 times for 70 yards and three touchdowns. He set the Super Bowl record for rushing yards and rushing touchdowns by a quarterback while tying the Super Bowl record for rushing touchdowns and points scored (20) as well. Smith was his top target with seven receptions, and led all receivers in the game with 100 yards, while Brown had six catches for 96 yards and a score.

The Chiefs' offensive line was heavily praised for their performance in the game. Philadelphia led the NFL with 70 sacks during the season, just two short of the league record. However, in the Super Bowl, Mahomes was not sacked at all, only the second time the Eagles had no sacks in their regular season or playoff games, while Kansas City's offense rushed for 158 yards.

Box score

Final statistics

Statistical comparison

Individual statistics

Completions/attemptsCarriesLong gainReceptionsTimes targeted

Starting lineups

Officials
Super Bowl LVII featured seven officials, a replay official, a replay assistant, and eight alternate officials. The numbers in parentheses below indicate their uniform numbers.

 Game officials:
 Referee: Carl Cheffers (51)
 Umpire: Roy Ellison (81)
 Down judge: Jerod Phillips (6)
 Line judge: Jeff Bergman (32)
 Field judge: John Jenkins (117)
 Side judge: Eugene Hall (103)
 Back judge: Dino Paganelli (105)
 Replay official: Mark Butterworth
 Replay assistant: Frank Szczepanik

 Alternate officials:
 Referee: John Hussey
Umpire: Ramon George
Down judge: David Oliver
Line judge: Tim Podraza
Field judge: Terry Brown
Side judge: Boris Cheek
Back judge: Perry Paganelli
Replay official: Tyler Cerimeli

References

External links
 
 

Super Bowl
2023 in American football
2023 in American television
2023 in sports in Arizona
2022 National Football League season
American football in Arizona
Events in Glendale, Arizona
February 2023 sports events in the United States
Kansas City Chiefs postseason
Philadelphia Eagles postseason
Sports competitions in Maricopa County, Arizona
Sports in Glendale, Arizona
Sports riots